The Ann Stevens House is a historic home in Lake Helen, Florida, United States. It is located at 201 East Kicklighter Road. On August 18, 1993, it was added to the U.S. National Register of Historic Places.

Gallery

References

External links
 Volusia County listings at National Register of Historic Places
 Volusia County listings at Florida's Office of Cultural and Historical Programs

Houses on the National Register of Historic Places in Volusia County, Florida
Vernacular architecture in Florida